2,7-Dihydrothiepine is a partially saturated analog of thiepine.

Thiepines